"Highland" is a song performed by Swedish group One More Time. The song was written by Nanne Grönvall and Peter Grönvall, and released as a single in 1992. The song became one of the group's most international successes, ending up at number two on the Swedish Singles Chart. The song also appears on the group's 1992 debut studio album Highland.

Cover versions
Blackmore's Night recorded a version of the song for their 2010 album Autumn Sky.

Single track listing
Vinyl 7-inch CNR
 "Highland" - 5:22
 "Vitality" - 4:55

Vinyl 7-inch PWL
 "Highland (edited version)" - 4:32
 "Vitality" - 4:55

Vinyl 12-inch PWL
 "Highland (complete version)" - 5.22
 "Vitality" 4.55
 "Highland (edited version)" - 4.32

Cassette PWL
 "Highland (edited version)" - 4.32
 "Vitality" - 4.55

CD5 CNR (Sweden)
 "Highland (edited version)" - 4.32
 "Highland (complete version)" - 5.22
 "Vitality" - 4.55

CD5 PWL (England)
 "Highland (edited version)" - 4.32
 "Highland (complete version)" - 5.22
 "Vitality" - 4.55

CD5 Ultrapop (Germany)
 "Highland (edited version)" - 4.32
 "Highland (complete version)" - 5.22
 "Vitality" - 4.55

CD5 KONGA (Spain)
 "Highland (edited version)" - 4.32
 "Highland (complete version)" - 5.22
 "Vitality" - 4.55

CD5 Pappersomslag Touch of Gold / Polygram (France)
 "Highland (edited version)" - 4.32
 "Highland (complete version)" - 5.22

CD5 Touch of Gold / Polygram (France)
 "Highland (edited version)" - 4.32
 "Highland (complete version)" - 5.22
 "Vitality" - 4.55

Charts

References

1992 singles
English-language Swedish songs
Songs written by Nanne Grönvall
1992 songs